Paul English may refer to:

 Paul English (drummer), drummer with Willie Nelson
 Paul M. English, Boston-based entrepreneur and philanthropist